Goetbé Edmond Jitangar (born 2 November 1952 in Bokoro, Chad) is a Chadian Roman Catholic bishop. He was Bishop of the Sarh, from 1991 to 2016, and has been Archbishop of N'Djamena since 2016.

Career 
Jitangar received the ordination to the priesthood on 30 December 1978. On 11 October 1991, Pope John Paul II named him Bishop of the Sarh. The prefect of the Congregation for the Evangelization of Peoples, Jozef Tomko announced his consecration to bishop. The consecration was completed by the bishop of Mondou, Matthias N'Gartéri Mayadi and the emitted Bishop of Sarh, Henri Veniat SJ.

Bishop Jitangar was named Metropolitan Archbishop-designate of the Roman Catholic Archdiocese of N'Djamena, Chad, by Pope Francis on Saturday, August 20, 2016, following the death of the previous Archbishop in 2013. Jitangar was installed as Archbishop of N'Djamena on 15 October 2016.

References

External links 
 Entry to Archbishop Goetbé Edmond Djitangar [Catholic-Hierarchy] on catholic-hierarchy.org

 
 

1952 births
Living people
Chadian Roman Catholic archbishops
People from Hadjer-Lamis Region
20th-century Roman Catholic bishops in Chad
21st-century Roman Catholic bishops in Chad
21st-century Roman Catholic archbishops in Africa
Roman Catholic bishops of Sarh
Roman Catholic archbishops of N'Djaména